Chu Hoàng Diệu Linh (born 11 January 1994) is a female Vietnamese Taekwondo practitioner competing for Vietnam at the Summer Olympics 2012 in London in the -67 kg category,
after winning a silver medal at the Asian Qualification Tournament. She was a gold medalist in her native country in 2010, and later earned a bronze medal at the 2011 Southeast Asian Games.

See also 
 Summer Olympic 2012 Taekwondo qualification

References

External links
 
 Chu Hoang Dieu Linh at the Summer Olympic 2012
 Vietnamese article on Chu Hoang Dieu Linh
 
 

1994 births
Living people
Vietnamese female taekwondo practitioners
Olympic taekwondo practitioners of Vietnam
Taekwondo practitioners at the 2012 Summer Olympics
Taekwondo practitioners at the 2010 Asian Games
Southeast Asian Games bronze medalists for Vietnam
Southeast Asian Games medalists in taekwondo
Competitors at the 2011 Southeast Asian Games
Asian Games competitors for Vietnam
Sportspeople from Hanoi
21st-century Vietnamese women
20th-century Vietnamese women